Ingor Antte Ailu Gaup, or in correct Sámi spelling: Iŋgor Ántte Áilu Gaup, artist-name Ailloš (born 25 March 1960 in Kautokeino, Norway) is a Sámi actor, composer, and folk musician. He is the brother of professor and politician Ole Henrik Magga and visual artist .

Career 
Gaup was an early part of the rock group Ivnniiguin, which, among other things, created arrangements of poems by Ailo Gaup, whose work, the musical , was presented at the Kautokeino Theater and at cultural festivals in Nord-Norge. This piqued an interest in theater, which led to the establishment of Beaivváš National Sámi Theatre / Sámi Našunálateáhter Beaivváš (SNTB), which he has been part of since 1983.

He has also had roles in Norwegian film and television, such as the film , the series  (1994), and has also contributed to such musical publications as Jan Garbarek's I Took Up the Runes (1990). Together with Nils-Aslak Valkeapää, he released  (1993). Since 1993, he has been part of accordionist Gabriel Fliflet's group , which has toured the country together with Knut Reiersrud in the jazz joik performance .

Gaup received the Nordlys award in 2003, and participated in the Nordlys Festival in 2004 with singer Solveig Kringlebotn. Together with Kristin Mellem, he released Jeđđehus (2004), which was nominated for the Edvardprisen in (2005). His newest album includes the musicians Svein Schultz, Kenneth Ekornes, and Stein Austrud.

Awards 
In 1999, Gaup received the Áillohaš Music Award, a Sámi music award conferred by the municipality of Kautokeino and the Kautokeino Sámi Association to honor the significant contributions the recipient or recipients has made to the diverse world of Sámi music.

In 2003, he won the Nordlysprisen.

References

Notes

Sources

External links 
 Ivnniiguin on MySpace

1960 births
Living people
People from Kautokeino
Sámi actors
Norwegian Sámi musicians
Áillohaš Music Award winners
Norwegian musicians
Norwegian folk musicians